Jan Leopold Alois "Koza" Palouš (25 October 1888 – 25 September 1971) was a Czechoslovak ice hockey player who competed in the 1920 Summer Olympics and in the 1924 Winter Olympics. He was born in České Budějovice, Czechoslovakia and died in Prague, Czechoslovakia.

He was a member of the Czechoslovak ice hockey team which won the bronze medal in 1920. Four years later he also participated in the first Winter Olympic ice hockey tournament.

References

External links

1888 births
1971 deaths
Czech ice hockey defencemen
Czechoslovak film directors
Czechoslovak ice hockey defencemen
Ice hockey players at the 1920 Summer Olympics
Ice hockey players at the 1924 Winter Olympics
Medalists at the 1920 Summer Olympics
Olympic bronze medalists for Czechoslovakia
Olympic ice hockey players of Czechoslovakia
Olympic medalists in ice hockey
Sportspeople from České Budějovice